WMYE (91.9 FM) is a radio station licensed to Fort Myers, Florida, United States.  The station is currently owned by Call Communications Group.

References

External links
 

Mass media in Fort Myers, Florida
MYE